Crystal Ball is the sixth album by Styx, released in 1976.

This album marked the recording debut of new guitarist Tommy Shaw. The track "Mademoiselle" was Tommy Shaw's vocal debut and the album's Top-40 hit.

The album's title track would become a concert staple for the band, as it was performed on every subsequent Styx tour with which Shaw was involved.

Claude Debussy's classical piece "Clair de Lune" served as the intro to the album's closing track, "Ballerina". The version of "Clair de Lune" on Crystal Ball features only DeYoung on piano, with the key changed from D flat to C, as the next track ("Ballerina") begins in C minor.

Reception

Daevid Jehnzen of AllMusic rated Crystal Ball three-and-a-half out of five stars. He stated that it was better than Styx's previous album, Equinox (1975), although it was not as successful. He also said that the album showcases "Styx's increased skill for crafting simple, catchy pop hooks out of their bombastic sound." Alan Niester of Rolling Stone also, found the album favorable, stating that "although Styx is based in Chicago, the group has its English scam down pat". He also stated that the instrumentation "always seems on the verge of going out of control, giving the whole album an extra surge of excitement."

Track listing

Personnel

Styx
 Dennis DeYoung – vocals, keyboards
 James "JY" Young – vocals, electric guitars
 Tommy Shaw – vocals, electric and acoustic guitars
 Chuck Panozzo – bass guitar
 John Panozzo – drums, percussion

Production
 Producer: Styx
 Engineers: Barry Mraz and Rob Kingsland

Charts
Album – Billboard (United States)

Singles – Billboard (United States)

References

External links 
 Styx - Crystal Ball (1976) album review by Daevid Jehnzen, credits & releases at AllMusic.com
 Styx - Crystal Ball (1976) album releases & credits at Discogs.com
 Styx - Crystal Ball (1976) album to be listened as stream at Spotify.com

1976 albums
A&M Records albums
Styx (band) albums